Igor Leonidovich Trandenkov (born August 17, 1966 in Saint Petersburg) is a retired Russian pole vaulter best known for winning two Olympic silver medals. His personal best jump of 6.01 m makes him a part of the so-called 6 metres club.

He is married to Russian athlete, Marina Trandenkova.

International competitions

References

1966 births
Living people
Athletes from Saint Petersburg
Russian male pole vaulters
Olympic male pole vaulters
Olympic athletes of the Unified Team
Olympic athletes of Russia
Olympic silver medalists for the Unified Team
Olympic silver medalists for Russia
Olympic silver medalists in athletics (track and field)
Athletes (track and field) at the 1992 Summer Olympics
Athletes (track and field) at the 1996 Summer Olympics
Medalists at the 1992 Summer Olympics
Medalists at the 1996 Summer Olympics
Goodwill Games medalists in athletics
Competitors at the 1994 Goodwill Games
World Athletics Championships athletes for Russia
World Athletics Championships medalists
European Athletics Championships medalists
Russian Athletics Championships winners